Ven Te Chow (October 7, 1919, Hangzhou, China, – July 30, 1981), was a Chinese-American engineer. He was a widely recognized hydrologist and hydraulic engineer, acclaimed for his contributions to hydrology and water resources development.

He was a professor of Civil and Hydrosystems Engineering at the University of Illinois at Urbana-Champaign. He received his B.S. degree in civil engineering from the National Chiao Tung University in 1940, his M.S. degree in engineering mechanics from Pennsylvania State University in 1948, and his Ph.D. degree in hydraulic engineering from the University of Illinois in 1950.

Chow joined the faculty of the University of Illinois in the Department of Civil Engineering in 1948 and became a naturalized U.S. citizen in 1962. Some of his unusual contributions include his watershed experimentation system, which produced storms in the laboratory using sophisticated electronic, pneumatic, and sonar controls. At the time it was one of the most sophisticated laboratories in the world for physical hydrology and attracted worldwide attention and interest among scientists, engineers, and the public. It was the subject of an article that appeared in Life magazine on June 6, 1969, and was also addressed in the 1969 March issue of Public Works magazine.

With this unique instrumentation, he introduced a new field of technology known as watershed hydraulics. He also developed a formula for hydrologic frequency drainage design, a method of backwater curve computation.

Chow was the founder and first president of the International Water Resources Association (IWRA). Under Ven Te Chow's leadership, the IWRA began publishing the academic journal Water International in 1975.  Over the last 49 years, IWRA has actively promoted the sustainable management of water resources around the globe and become one of the most influential organizations in the field of water.

The IWRA Ven Te Chow Memorial Award was created by the IWRA in his memory. The award includes a lecture, to be delivered at its triennial World Water Congresses.

The American Society of Civil Engineers established the Ven Te Chow Award in his memory to recognize the lifetime achievements in the field of hydrologic engineering. The award is administered by the Surface Water Hydrology Technical Committee of the  Environmental and Water Resources Institute (EWRI). The award ceremony and lecture are held at annual World Environmental & Water Resources Congress.

Works

References

External links
International Water Resources Association website
Ven Te Chow Hydrosystems Laboratory @ UIUC

1919 births
1981 deaths
Hydraulic engineers
Hydrologists
University of Illinois Urbana-Champaign faculty
Chinese emigrants to the United States
Members of the United States National Academy of Engineering
Grainger College of Engineering alumni
20th-century American engineers
Penn State College of Engineering alumni
People from Hangzhou
Engineers from Zhejiang
20th-century Chinese engineers
National Chiao Tung University (Shanghai) alumni